Ferrucio Rontini (1893 – 1964) was an Italian painter, active in Livorno.

Biography
He was born in Florence, and trained at the Academy of Fine Arts of Florence. He was one of the founders of the Gruppo Labronico, displaying works with them in the first three exhibitions. However, he had a fierce disagreements and did not exhibit again until 1931, and again after the second world war.

References

20th-century Italian painters
Italian male painters
People from Livorno
Painters from Tuscany
1893 births
1964 deaths
20th-century Italian male artists

Gruppo Labronico